Dobropole may refer to the following places:
Dobropole, Gryfino County in West Pomeranian Voivodeship (north-west Poland)
Dobropole, Kamień County in West Pomeranian Voivodeship (north-west Poland)
Dobropole, Łobez County in West Pomeranian Voivodeship (north-west Poland)
Dobropole, Ternopil Oblast in Chortkiv Raion, Ternopil Oblast, Ukraine
 Dobropillia, Donetsk Oblast, Ukraine